Odites lividula is a moth in the family Depressariidae. It was described by Edward Meyrick in 1932. It is found in Japan.

References

Moths described in 1937
Odites
Taxa named by Edward Meyrick